Ampriani is a commune in the Haute-Corse department on the island of Corsica, France.

Geography
Ampriani is a commune on the eastern side of Corsica in the heart of the Pieve (religious jurisdiction) in the Serra in the canton of Moita Verde. It is 30 km by road north-west from Aleria and significantly less in a direct line and 16 km south-west of Moïta in the Valley of the Cursigliese. Access is by the D116 road from Tallone in the south-east which continues north of the village north-west to Zuani. Ampriani is a small village of a single row of houses with a watchtower aligned on a ridge at an altitude of about 600 metres (lowest point 320 m, highest point: 749 m) overlooking the valley and almost the entire plain. The village is nearly deserted in winter, but has about a hundred people in summer. The road leading to the village is a dead end and ends on the old "helicopter pad". The terrain in the commune is rugged and heavily forested.

Neighbouring communes and villages

History

Middle Ages
In the 16th century Ampriani was part of the Pieve di a Serra with two other villages which are in the current commune of Zuani. Around 1520 the three villages making up the Pieve were called:
Alpriano for Ampriani;
Cuiani for Zuani;
La Valle di Sagano.

From the 18th century to today
Before the 18th century Ampriani was still part of the Pieve di a Serra but to the three villages in 1520 were added the villages of:
Moitta (Moïta);
Mattra (Matra);
Pianello;
Zallana (Zalana).

The three original villages, meanwhile, had become:
Ampriani;
Zuvani (Zuani);
La Valle di Sagano had disappeared.

In 1790, with the French Revolution the Pieves became cantons. The Pieve di a Serra became the Canton of Serra, before taking the name Canton of Moïta in 1830.

In 1954 the communes of Aléria, Ampriani, Matra, Moïta, Pianello, Tallone, Zalana, and Zuani formed the Canton of Moïta.

Between 1971 and 1973, the two cantons of Moïta and  Pietra di Verde were merged. They form the current Canton of Moita Verde.

Today the Canton of Moita Verde is composed of fourteen communes. These are the six communes in the Canton of Pietra: Canale-di-Verde, Linguizzetta, Tox, Campi, A Petra, and Chiatra (to which can be added the two hamlets of Monticchio and Ersagie, which now belong respectively to the communes of Pietra-di-Verde and Chiatra and the second to U Monte). To these are added the eight communes of the Canton of Moïta to create the Canton of Moïta-Verde.

Administration

List of Successive Mayors

Demography
In 2017 the commune had 24 inhabitants.

Sites and Monuments

The Convent of Saint Francis of Zuani (1730) is registered as an historical monument.

See also
Communes of the Haute-Corse department

References

External links
Ampriani on Géoportail, National Geographic Institute (IGN) website 

Communes of Haute-Corse